Khairul Thaqif Shah bin Kamal Bashah (born 8 February 1996) is a Malaysian footballer who plays as a goalkeeper.

References

External links
 

1996 births
Living people
Malaysian footballers
Malaysia Super League players
PKNP FC players
Association football goalkeepers